The 1990 Soviet Cup Final was a football match that took place at the Lenin's Central Stadium, Moscow on 2 May 1990. The match was the 49th Soviet Cup Final and it was contested by FC Dynamo Kyiv and FC Lokomotiv Moscow. The Soviet Cup winner Dynamo qualified for the Cup Winners' Cup first round for the Soviet Union. The last year defending champions Dnipro Dnipropetrovsk were eliminated in the first round of the competition (1/16 of final) by PFC CSKA Moscow on away goal rule (1:1, 2:2). Dynamo played their 10th Cup Final winning on 9 occasions including this one. For Lokomotiv it was their only third Cup Final and the only loss at this stage.

Road to Moscow 

All sixteen Soviet Top League clubs did not have to go through qualification to get into the competition, so Dynamo and Lokomotiv both qualified for the competition automatically.

Previous encounters 

Previously these two teams never met each other in the such a late stages of the competition. However they did meet about five times in the Soviet Cup, usually in the first rounds. They first played each other in the Soviet Cup back in 1938.

Match details

See also
 Soviet Top League 1989

References

https://www.youtube.com/watch?v=M5FLCDi9lBo

External links 
The competition calendar
Report referring to Soviet Sport 
The competition calendar 
Media about final 1990 

1990
Cup Final
Soviet Cup Final 1990
Soviet Cup Final 1990
Soviet Cup Final
Soviet Cup Final